Wild Sumac is a 1917 American silent Western drama film directed by William V. Mong and starring Margery Wilson, Ed Brady and Frank Brownlee.

Cast
 Margery Wilson as Wild Sumac
 Ed Brady as John Lewisa 
 Frank Brownlee as Lupin
 Wilbur Higby as Armand du Fere
 Ray Jackson as Pierre du Fere
 Percy Challenger as Deacon Bricketts
 George Chesebro as Jacques Fontaine

References

Bibliography
 Langman, Larry. A Guide to Silent Westerns. Greenwood Publishing Group, 1992.

External links
 

1917 films
1917 Western (genre) films
1917 drama films
1910s English-language films
American black-and-white films
Triangle Film Corporation films
Films directed by William V. Mong
Silent American Western (genre) films
1910s American films